Let's Get Lost may refer to:

Film
 Let's Get Lost (1988 film), an Oscar-nominated documentary about jazz trumpeter Chet Baker
 Let's Get Lost (1997 film), a Danish drama film

Music
 "Let's Get Lost" (song), a classic jazz song by Jimmy McHugh and Frank Loesser from the 1943 film Happy Go Lucky, recorded by Chet Baker and others
 "Let's Get Lost", a song by Beck and Bat for Lashes from The Twilight Saga: Eclipse soundtrack
 "Let's Get Lost", a track on dEUS' album Worst Case Scenario
 "Let's Get Lost", a track on Elliott Smith's album From a Basement on the Hill
 "Let's Get Lost", a track on G-Eazy album These Things Happen
 "Let's Get Lost", a track on Carly Rae Jepsen's 2015 album Emotion
 "Let/s Get Lost", a track on The Twilight Sad's 2019 album It Won/t Be Like This All the Time
 Let's Get Lost (album)

Other
 Let's Get Lost, a young adult novel by Sarra Manning